The Yangon Central Women's Hospital is a public hospital in Yangon, Myanmar. It is also a tertiary care teaching hospital of the University of Medicine 1, Yangon, the Yangon Institute of Nursing, and the University of Paramedical Science, Yangon.

History 

The hospital was formerly known as "Dufferin Hospital", after Hariot Hamilton-Temple-Blackwood, Marchioness of Dufferin and Ava.

References

Hospital buildings completed in 1960
Hospitals in Yangon